K21 may refer to:

Vehicles 
Automobiles
 K21, a South Korean infantry fighting vehicle
 Changhe Freedom K21, a Chinese pickup truck

Ships
 , a frigate of the Royal Navy
 , a corvette of the Swedish Navy

Other uses 
 Gastroesophageal reflux
 Lactobacillus plantarum strain K21
 Uniform k21 polytope
 "Va, dal furor portata", an aria by Wolfgang Amadeus Mozart